The Grateful Dead is the debut album of the Grateful Dead. It was released by Warner Bros. Records in March 1967. According to the biographies of both bassist Phil Lesh and drummer Bill Kreutzmann, the band released the album as San Francisco's Grateful Dead.

History
The album was primarily recorded at RCA's Studio A, in Los Angeles, in only four days. The band had wanted to record the tracks in their hometown of San Francisco, but no recording studios in the area had modernized equipment at the time. The group picked David Hassinger to produce because he had worked as an engineer on the Rolling Stones' "(I Can't Get No) Satisfaction" and Jefferson Airplane's Surrealistic Pillow album (on the latter of which Jerry Garcia had guested and suggested the album title). Due to demands by the band's label, Warner Brothers, four of the tracks were edited for length. Phil Lesh comments in his autobiography, "to my ear, the only track that sounds at all like we did at the time is Viola Lee Blues. ...None of us had any experience with performing for recording...the whole process felt a bit rushed." Bill Kreutzmann, in his autobiography, says of the songs, "their recorded versions failed to capture the energy that we had when we performed them live. ...We weren’t that good yet. We were still learning how to be a band."

Though the album was considered "a big deal in San Francisco", it did not see much airplay on AM radio stations outside of the Bay Area. The freeform FM radio format that favored bands like the Dead was still developing. Warner Bros. held an album release party on March 20, 1967 at the Fugazi Hall in North Beach. The label's A & R manager, Joe Smith, is noted for saying he "[is] proud that Warner Bros. is introducing the Grateful Dead to the world."

The band used the collective pseudonym "McGannahan Skjellyfetti" for their group-written originals and arrangements. The name was a misrendering of "Skujellifeddy", a character in Kenneth Patchen's comic novel The Memoirs of a Shy Pornographer, plus the name of then-frontman Pigpen's cat. In an era where true authorship (or public domain status) was more difficult to ascertain, "Cold Rain and Snow" and "New, New Minglewood Blues" were originally credited as band compositions, though they were adaptations of existing songs.

A remastered version with the full versions of five album tracks, plus six bonus tracks, was released by Rhino as part of the box set The Golden Road (1965–1973) in 2001, and as a separate album in 2003. Album outtake "Alice D. Millionaire" was inspired by an autumn 1966 newspaper headline "LSD Millionaire", about the Dead's sound engineer and benefactor Owsley Stanley.

The album was reissued for Record Store Day 2011 on 180g vinyl cut from the original analog/mono masters from 1967 - the first time in over 40 years it had been released in this form. The 2013 high-definition digital, remastered release features the edited versions, as originally released, of the four tracks which were extended for the 2003 Rhino release.

This edition was given a new version for the album's 50th anniversary in 2017, including a second CD featuring live material from a pair of July 1966 concerts in the Garden Auditorium, Vancouver, Canada. The second CD was released on vinyl as a stand-alone double LP on Record Store Day 2017.

Album cover
On the originally prepared artwork, the writing for the top of the album cover read "In the land of the dark, the ship of the sun is drawn by the Grateful Dead", a passage taken from the Egyptian Book of the Dead. As the book had become more widely read, some had mistakenly assumed that the band had taken their name from the quote:
"We now return our souls to the creator, as we stand on the edge of eternal darkness. Let our chant fill the void in order that others may know. In the land of the night, the ship of the sun is drawn by the grateful dead." They hadn't, and because Garcia worried that it seemed "pretentious", and the band were uneasy about being seen as beholden to any specific philosophy or doctrine, they asked the artist, Stanley Mouse, to stylize the script so that all but the band name were illegible. The central image depicts a 12th-century Chola sculpture of Yoga-Narasimha, an avatar of Vishnu. The sculpture is currently housed at the Nelson-Atkins Museum of Art.

Critical reception 

Reviewing in 1967 for The Village Voice, Richard Goldstein called the album "straight, decent rhythm and blues" and "a perfect illustration" of "a GOOD ALBUM, like those long lasting cold remedies … filled with tiny time capsules which burst open at their own speed. Cuts that astound at first fade as subtle ballads emerge. Great blasts of noise vanish as haunting melodies appear. A line suddenly hits home... a phrase... a shade of meaning, and the whole album becomes something else again."

In 2007, The Grateful Dead was included on Rolling Stone magazine's list of the 40 essential albums from 1967. In a piece accompanying the list, Robert Christgau wrote of the album:

Track listing

 Sides one and two were combined as tracks 1–9 on CD reissues.

track 1 recorded at Coast Recorders, San Francisco, CA (January 1967)
tracks 2 to 9 recorded at RCA Studio A, Los Angeles, CA (January 1967)
reissued CD contains full-length versions of tracks 3, 5, 6, & 8 

tracks 10 to 13 recorded at RCA Victor Studio A, Hollywood, CA (February 2, 1967)
track 14 is an edit of track 9
track 15 recorded live at Dance Hall, Rio Nido, CA (September 3, 1967). Master reels are missing the beginning; track begins at the end of the second verse. Another track from this date is on Fallout from the Phil Zone.

50th Anniversary Deluxe Edition – disc two

Personnel
Grateful Dead
Bob Weir – rhythm guitar, vocals
Ron "Pigpen" McKernan – Vox Continental organ, harmonica, vocals
Bill The Drummer (Bill Kreutzmann) – drums, percussion
Jerry "Captain Trips" Garcia – lead guitar, vocals, arrangement
Phil Lesh – bass guitar, vocals

Technical personnel
Dick Bogert – engineering
Betty Cantor – engineering
Bob Cassidy – engineering
David Hassinger – production

Reissue production credits
James Austin – reissue production
Joe Gastwirt – mastering, production consultant
Cassidy Law – project coordination, Grateful Dead Archives
Eileen Law – archival research, Grateful Dead Archives
David Lemieux – reissue production
Peter McQuaid – executive production, Grateful Dead Productions
Jeffrey Norman – additional mixing on bonus tracks
Michael Wesley Johnson – associate production, research coordination

50th Anniversary Edition production credits

 Produced for release by David Lemieux
 Executive Producer: Mark Pinkus
 Associate Producer: Doran Tyson, Ivette Ramos
 Package Design: Steve Vance
 Tape Research: Michael Wesley Johnson

Charts
Billboard chart

See also
Grateful Dead discography

References

1967 debut albums
Grateful Dead albums
Rhino Records albums
Warner Records albums
Albums produced by David Hassinger